Soyasaponin III rhamnosyltransferase (UGT91H4, GmSGT3 (gene)) is an enzyme with systematic name UDP-rhamnose:soyasaponin III rhamnosyltransferase. This enzyme catalyses the following chemical reaction:

 UDP-rhamnose + soyasaponin III  UDP + soyasaponin I

Part of the biosynthetic pathway for soyasaponins.

References

External links 

EC 2.4.1